The 2013 UK Masters  was the first of eight PDC European Tour events on the 2013 PDC Pro Tour. The tournament took place at the Butlin's Minehead in Minehead, England, from 8–10 March 2013. It featured a field of 64 players and £100,000 in prize money, with £20,000 going to the winner.

John Part won his first European Tour title and first ranking title in 18 months by defeating Stuart Kellett 6–4 in the final.

Prize money

Qualification
The top 32 players from the PDC ProTour Order of Merit on the 29 January 2013 automatically qualified for the event. The remaining 32 places went to players from two qualifying events - 24 from the UK Qualifier (held in Crawley on 22 February), and eight from the European Qualifier (held in Hamburg on 31 January).

1–32

UK Qualifier
  Adam Hunt (first round)
  Simon Craven (first round)
  Paul Rowley (first round)
  David Pallett (second round)
  John Henderson (first round)
  Arron Monk (third round)
  Alan Tabern (first round)
  Jim Walker (first round)
  Nigel Heydon (second round)
  Keith Rooney (first round)
  Ross Smith (first round)
  Stuart Kellett (runner-up)
  Michael Smith (first round)
  John Part (winner)
  Dave Honey (first round)
  Kevin McDine (first round)
  Daryl Gurney (first round)
  Ian Moss (first round)
  Steve West (first round)
  Darren Webster (first round)
  Tony West (second round)
  Reece Robinson (first round)
  Andy Pearce (first round)
  Brian Woods (first round)

European Qualifier
  Kurt van de Rijck (second round)
  Mensur Suljović (third round)
  Michael Rasztovits (first round)
  Jarkko Komula (first round)
  Tomas Seyler (first round)
  Bernd Roith (second round)
  Jyhan Artut (first round)
  Jelle Klaasen (first round)

Draw

References

UK Masters
UK Masters
UK Masters
Darts in the United Kingdom
Sports competitions in Somerset
Minehead
2010s in Somerset